Joseph F. "Joe-joe" D'Agostino, Jr. was a college football player. A two-way offensive and defensive guard for the Florida Gators, D'Agostino was an honorable mention All-American and twice received first-team All-SEC honors. He was a key member of the 1952 team's line which blocked for the renowned backfield which included the likes of Rick Casares, Papa Hall, and Buford Long. He was drafted into the NFL by the Baltimore Colts, but never played due to injury.

See also
 List of University of Florida Athletic Hall of Fame members

References

American football guards
Florida Gators football players